Mount Williwaw is a prominent  mountain summit located in the Chugach Mountains, in Anchorage Municipality in the U.S. state of Alaska. The Williwaw Lakes lie below the north and west slopes of the mountain and provide pleasant campsites for climbers not wanting to climb the mountain in one arduous day. The mountain's name was officially adopted in 1964 by the United States Geological Survey based on a recommendation by the Mountaineering Club of Alaska because an infantry company from nearby Fort Richardson was caught in a williwaw near this mountain in May 1962. Three men died of exhaustion before the group was rescued. The first ascent of this peak was made June 11, 1965, by David Judd, M. Judd, Myers, and Parker via the South Ridge.

Climate

Based on the Köppen climate classification, Mount Williwaw is located in a subarctic climate with long, cold, snowy winters, and mild summers. Temperatures can drop below −20 °C with wind chill factors below −30 °C. Precipitation runoff from the peak drains into Ship Creek and Campbell Creek.

See also

List of mountain peaks of Alaska
Geology of Alaska

References

Gallery

External links
 Weather forecast: Mount Williwaw
 Climbing Williwaw's northwest ridge: YouTube

Williwaw
Williwaw
Williwaw